Penelope (Padgett) Hodgson Craven Barker, commonly known as Penelope Barker (June 17, 1728  – 1796), was an activist—in the lead up to the American Revolution (1775–1781)—who organized a boycott of British goods in 1774 by a group of women known as the Edenton Tea Party. It was the "first recorded women's political demonstration in America".

By the time that she was seventeen years of age, she helped raise her sister's three children and married her sister's husband, John Hodgson, which began her life as a mother and planter. She married two more times to wealthy men, continuing to run plantations after their deaths. She gave birth to five children and was the stepmother to four children, all but two of whom had died by 1761. Stepson Thomas Hodgson died in 1772. Her only remaining child then was Betsy Barker, who lived to adulthood and married William Tunstall, a successful planter.

Dillard described her as "one of those lofty, intrepid, high-born women peculiarly fitted by nature to lead; fear formed no part of her composition. Her face bears the expression of sternness without harshness, which a cheap novelist would describe as hauteur. She was a brilliant conversationalist, and a society leader of her day."

Early life and family

Penelope Padgett was born June 17, 1728 at Blenheim Manor in Edenton in Colony of North Carolina, one of three daughters to Samuel Padgett, a physician, and Elizabeth Blount. Her sisters were Sarah and Elizabeth. Padgett was the granddaughter of Anne Willis and James Blount, a prominent planter of Chowan County. The Padgetts lived on a 2,000-acre plantation. As she grew up, Penelope lived a comfortable life of teas, church suppers, parties, and balls.

By 1745, when she was a teen, her father and married sister, Elizabeth Hodgson, died consecutively, leaving her to raise Elizabeth's children, Isabella, John, and Robert. Her brother-in-law, a lawyer named John Hodgson, managed her father's estate.

Personal life and planter

Barker married her deceased sister's husband, John Hodgson, in 1745 at about the age of 17. Their first son was Samuel. Only two years after their marriage, John died, when she was pregnant with their second son Thomas. She also had her sister and husband's three children to raise. She ran the Hodgson plantations, with 25 enslaved people. When she was 21 years of age, the Court doubted that she was old enough to raise and educate five children. They threatened to remove her children. In October 1751, she was returned to guardian of her three stepchildren.

In 1752, Barker married wealthy bachelor James Craven, who was a planter and politician. From Doughton, Yorkshire, England, he immigrated to Colonial North Carolina by 1734. They did not have any children of their own. Barker brought income into the family by renting out some of their enslaved people and selling sugar, nutmeg, cinnamon, and packs of cards. She purchased luxury items like rum, salt, sugar, molasses, and chocolate. When James died in 1755, she and the children inherited his estate and she became the richest woman in the Province of North Carolina.

For the third and final time, she married Thomas Barker, an attorney and a member of the House of Burgesses in Edenton in 1757, who was 16 years older than her, becoming Penelope Barker. He was previously married and brought a daughter named Betsy into the marriage. They had three children—Penelope, Thomas, and Nathaniel—all of whom died very young, from a few to ten months of age. 

Thomas, a representative of the North Carolina's assembly to the board of trade, sailed to Europe in 1761 and was delayed in returning due to the British blockade of American ships during the American Revolutionary War. While her husband was unable to return home from London, Barker managed their estates and home, which included two children. By that time, she had lost four of her own children and three children from her husbands' previous marriages. Her son Thomas Hodgson died at the age of 25 in 1772. Her stepson John Hodgson died in 1774. Betsy Barker married a successful planter William Tunstall from Pittsylvania County in Colony of Virginia. 

During the Revolutionary War, Barker protected her residence from the British,

Thomas returned in September 1778. In 1782, Thomas and his wife built a home, known today as the Barker House. Thomas died on December 10, 1790, Barker inherited her husband's estate of 25 enslaved people, their luxury furnishings, and the plantation. Barker died in 1796. She and her husband are buried alongside each other in the small graveyard called Johnston's cemetery at Hayes Plantation, near Edenton.

Edenton Tea Party

Barker was known as a patriot of the Revolution and ten months after the famous Boston Tea Party, she organized a Tea Party of her own. Barker wrote a statement proposing a boycott on British goods, like cloth and tea. Followed by 50 other women, the Edenton Tea Party was created. On October 25, 1774, Barker and her supporters, Edenton Ladies Patriotic Guild, met at the house of Elizabeth King to sign the Edenton Tea Party resolution that protested the British Tea Act of 1773.  It was the "first recorded women's political demonstration in [Colonial] America". Barker continued to protest throughout the Revolutionary War.

The petition was published in colonial newspapers and in London. Barker also sent a "fiery letter" to London. The women were mocked in the London papers. A political cartoon entitled "Edenton Tea Party" was published and released in London on January 16, 1775. The cartoon portrayed the women as bad mothers with loose morals and received misogynistic ridicule.

The women praised as patriots by the Colonial American press. Other women followed suit by swearing off tea. Southern women danced in ballgowns made from homespun fabric (that started with the homespun movement). Northern women had spinning bees for the production of homemade material. A ship-load of imported East India Company tea was locked away in a port in Charles Town (now Charleston, South Carolina) for months because it could not be sold with the tax. At the start of the Revolution, a group of patriots gathered the tea and sold it to other patriots to fund the rebellion against the British. They had also ousted royal officials and agents at the time. The Daughters of Liberty, like the Sons of Liberty, boycotted British goods.

In 1908, a plaque was dedicated by the Daughters of the American Revolution of North Carolina and placed in thestate Capitol Building in Raleigh, North Carolina. It honored her leadership at the Edenton Tea Party. In 1940, marker was placed at West Queen Street (US 17 Business) in Edenton by the North Carolina Highway Historical Marker Program. It states, "Women in this town led by Penelope Barker in 1774 resolved to boycott British imports. Early and influential activism by women."

Notes

References

Sources
 
 
  that was a Master's dissertation, and published

Further reading
 Edenton History FAQs, Edenton North Carolina, n.d., (21 June 2006).

1728 births
1796 deaths
North Carolina patriots in the American Revolution
People of pre-statehood North Carolina
People from Edenton, North Carolina
Women in the American Revolution